Clovis Watson Jr. (born September 30, 1958) is the sheriff of Alachua County, Florida. A Democrat, he was elected in 2020. Previously, he served four terms in the Florida House of Representatives from 2012 to 2020, representing the 20th District, encompassing eastern Alachua County and northwestern Marion County from Gainesville to Ocala.

Early life
Watson is the fourth child of six, and lived in Alachua County Alachua's during his childhood. Spending his elementary schools years in segregated Alachua County Alachua County Schools, and was of the first class of school integration in 1970. As a teenager he worked at a packing shed off County Road 235, packing fruit during the school year to help his father who had two jobs, and during the summer he was cropping tobacco and picking squash until dark for $10 a day to help pay for school clothes.

Education
Santa Fe College Santa Fe College, Law Enforcement Certification; Santa Fe College Santa Fe College, AS Associate degree, Criminal Justice Technology; University of Alabama University of Alabama, BA Bachelor's degree, Interdisciplinary Studies, Human Services; Mountain State University, MA Master's degree, Interdisciplinary Studies, Public Administration; Northcentral University, MBA Master of Business Administration; Harvard University John F. Kennedy Graduate School of Government Executive Education, Leadership for the 21st Century, Graduate; Northcentral University, Business Administration and Public Administration, Doctoral Candidate.

Pre-Legislative Career
He worked for the police department in the city of Alachua, working his way up to Deputy Chief of Police. Afterwards, he became the city manager of Alachua, and worked for Santa Fe College as an adjunct professor of state and local government.
During his tenure as City Manager, Alachua showed tremendous growth as both industrial and technological businesses moved to the city.

Legislative career
In 2012, when Florida House districts were reconfigured, Watson opted to run in the newly created 20th District. In the Democratic primary, Watson defeated Marihelen Wheeler, receiving 59% of the vote. He was only opposed by a write-in candidate, Robert W. Brinkman, in the general election, and received 99% of the vote against him. While serving in the Florida House of Representatives, Clovis watson sat on the House Committee on State Affairs from 2013–2014, served as the Ranking member on the House Committee on State Affairs in 2015, in 2017 he sat on the House Committee on Government Accountability and was later on the Joint Committee on Administrative Procedures, State Affairs Committee, Subcommittee on Agriculture and Natural Resources.

Watson was re-elected to the House for three consecutive terms in 2014, 2016, and 2018 and running unopposed in each race. He was term-limited in 2020 after serving four terms.

Alachua Sheriff 
On August 20, 2019, Clovis Watson announced his candidacy for sheriff of Alachua County. His opponent in the Democratic Primary was incumbent Sheriff Sadie Darnell, who held the position since 2006. Watson defeated Darnell with 59% of the vote in the August 18, 2020 primary. He was unopposed in the general election after the one write-in candidate, Robert Brinkman, withdrew.

Personal Accolades 

Following the 2019 Legislative Session, Clovis Watson received the "People's Champion" award from Progress Florida

in 2016 Clovis Watson earned a "Voice of Equality" award from Equality Florida.

Alachua Chamber of Commerce, Lifetime Achievement Award

Alachua County Democratic Black Caucus, Democrat of the Year Award

Department of Veteran Affairs of North Florida/South Georgia, Certificate of Appreciation for Volunteerism

Florida Democratic Black Caucus, Public Servant Award of the Year

Gainesville Lodge of Fraternal Order of Police, Administrator of the Year Award

Governor's Peace at Home Award, presented by the late Governor Lawton Chiles

Greater New Hope Missionary Baptist Church, Leadership Courage Award

International Association of Chiefs of Police, Professional and Outstanding Achievement in Law Enforcement Award

NAACP - Alachua County Branch, Rev. Dr. T. A. Wright Leadership Award

University of Alabama, Alice Parker Award for Outstanding Work in Humanities

Alachua County Democratic Party, The Buck Stops Here Award, 2013

Florida Farm Bureau, Champion for Agriculture, 2013

Progress Florida, Florida Watch Action, America Votes, Progressive Florida Middle Class Champion, 2013

City of Alachua, Florida, street dedication: "Clovis Watson, Jr. Way" located in front of the housing project where he grew up, 2008

Mountain State University Graduate Program, Distinguished Alumni Award, 2004

Alachua Chamber of Commerce, Officer of the Year Award, 1987, 2001.

Watson has also been lauded by firefighters for his push to expand their health benefits.

References

External links
Florida House of Representatives – Clovis Watson Jr.
 Ballotpedia entry
 Vote Smart entry

1958 births
Living people
Democratic Party members of the Florida House of Representatives
People from Gainesville, Florida
21st-century American politicians
People from Alachua, Florida
Mountain State University alumni